Anthony Messere (born 3 April 1996) is a professional freeride mountain bike rider from Surrey, British Columbia. He made his debut at Crankworx Red Bull Joyride in Whistler, British Columbia in 2011 at fifteen years old. Becoming the youngest athlete ever on a Crankworx podium,  placing 3rd.
He was considered a prodigy and was the first of a new generation of Slopestyle. In 2014 he won Crankworx Les Deux Alpes Slopestyle, which was his first major Slopestyle victory. Also taking another 3rd at Crankworx Whistler later in 2014. Placing 3rd overall in the FMBA world tour.

References

Living people
1996 births
Canadian mountain bikers
Canadian male cyclists
Sportspeople from Surrey, British Columbia